The 2nd Southeast Asia Basketball Association Championship was held from 24 November to 1 December in Surabaya, Indonesia. Matches were held at the Kertajaya Stadium which has a 5,000 seating capacity. Cambodia participated for the first time at the tournament.

Round robin

|}
Known matches

Final round

Third place match

Final

Awards

References 

1996
1996–97 in Asian basketball
1996 in Indonesian sport
International basketball competitions hosted by Indonesia